The Theodore Roosevelt United States Courthouse is a courthouse in Downtown Brooklyn, New York City, that houses the United States District Court for the Eastern District of New York. It is across the street from the Federal Building and Post Office, which houses, among other things, the Eastern District of New York's bankruptcy court.

History 
The courthouse stands on the location of the previous federal courthouse named the Emanuel Celler Federal Building. The previous courthouse, which was built in 1963, was a 6-story building that became unable to accommodate the court. This building underwent major renovations in 1999 under the direction of architect César Pelli. The building contains 16 courtrooms and 9 magistrate courtrooms. The construction incorporated several extraordinary security features, such as having a structural frame that can withstand an explosion and having laminated glass face the exterior. On September 17, 2008, the courthouse was officially renamed in honor of Theodore Roosevelt with President George W. Bush signing into law legislation introduced by Senator Charles Schumer. A rededication ceremony was held on December 30 of that year.

Located on Cadman Plaza in Downtown Brooklyn, east of Brooklyn Heights, it is one of many federal buildings in the area whose construction and renovation has played a role in revitalizing Downtown Brooklyn.

Along with the Alfonse M. D'Amato United States Courthouse in Central Islip, New York, the Theodore Roosevelt Courthouse houses the United States District Court for the Eastern District of New York. The Theodore Roosevelt Courthouse serves as its administrative headquarters.

See also 
 List of United States federal courthouses
 List of United States federal courthouses in New York

References

External links 

 U.S. District Court for the Eastern District of New York
 Courthouse profile on E.D.N.Y. website

César Pelli buildings
Courthouses in New York City
Downtown Brooklyn
Federal courthouses in the United States
Government buildings completed in 2006
Government buildings in Brooklyn